B. R. Cecil was an American football player and coach. He served as the head football coach at Hampden–Sydney College in Hampden Sydney, Virginia in 1911, compiling a record of 3–5. He played college football at the University of Virginia, serving as team captain in 1909.

Head coaching record

References

Year of birth missing
Year of death missing
American football tackles
Virginia Cavaliers football players
Hampden–Sydney Tigers football coaches
All-Southern college football players